Tupik is a rural locality (a selo) and the administrative center of Tungiro-Olyokminsky District of Zabaykalsky Krai, Russia. Population:

Geography 

History
It was founded in 1911 as a result of an unsuccessful attempt of paving the road to Yakutsk. The project was frozen because of the outbreak of World War I, which is how the village got its name (literally meaning cul-de-sac).

During the war, many POWs were sent here. In April 1919, a partisan group of internationalists, mainly Hungarians, was exterminated by the Japanese expeditionary corps and ataman Grigory Semyonov's troops (the Jewish regiment).

In 1938, Tupik was chosen to be the administrative center of Tungiro-Olyokminsky District. Russians, Ukrainians, and Evenks are three main ethnic groups in Tupik.

References

Rural localities in Tungiro-Olyokminsky District